Hornsundtind is a mountain south of the fjord Hornsund at the southern part of Spitsbergen, Svalbard. Its height is 1,431 metres.

References

Mountains of Spitsbergen